Vin English (3 April 1929 – 3 February 1999) was an Australian rules footballer who played with Carlton in the Victorian Football League (VFL).

Notes

External links 

Vin English's profile at Blueseum

1929 births
1999 deaths
Carlton Football Club players
Australian rules footballers from Victoria (Australia)
Sandhurst Football Club players